Danger music is an experimental form of avant-garde 20th and 21st century music and performance art. It is based on the concept that some pieces of music can or will harm either the listener or the performer, understanding that the piece in question may or may not be performed. Kyle Gann describes in his book Music Downtown: Writings from the Village Voice how Takehisa Kosugi's composition Music for a Revolution directs the performer to "[s]coop out one of your eyes 5 years from now and do the same with the other eye 5 years later". Works such as this are also sometimes referred to as anti-music because they seem to rebel against the concept of music itself. Danger music is often closely associated with the Fluxus school of composition, especially the work of Dick Higgins who composed a series of works entitled Danger Music.

In performance

As with many forms of concept music and performance art, the lines between "music", "art", "theater", and "social protest" are not always clear or apparent.  Danger Music consequently has some things in common with the performance art of artists such as Mark Pauline and Chris Burden.  For instance, some extreme examples of danger music direct performers to use sounds so loud that they will deafen the participants, or ask performers to throw antipersonnel bombs into the audience.

Yamantaka Eye's noise project Hanatarash was notable for its dangerous live shows, the most famous instance being when the Japanese artist drove an excavator through the venue at the back of the stage. There were also reports of audience members being required to fill out waivers before shows to prevent the band or the venue being sued in case of any potential danger caused to them.

Other pieces involve more symbolic forms of "danger", such as Nam June Paik's "Danger Music for Dick Higgins," which directs the performer to "creep into the vagina of a living whale."

In the studio
Ryan Weber's solo project Nacadamia Nutcase is a consistently prime example of extreme harsh noise-tinged danger music, posing both a danger to himself as well as the listener.

See also
Sonic weapon
20th-century classical music
Contemporary music
Experimental music
Noise music
Chris Burden

References

Further reading
Cope, David Techniques of the Contemporary Composer
Friedman, Ken The Fluxus Reader
Higgins, Hannah Fluxus Experience
Nyman, Michael Experimental Music:  Cage and Beyond

20th-century music genres
21st-century music genres
Noise music
Experimental music genres
Fluxus
Power electronics (music)